1893 was the fourth season of County Championship cricket in England. For the first time, the official championship was won by a team other than Surrey, who finished fifth. Yorkshire, captained by Lord Hawke won twelve matches to take the title. It was the first of a record eight championships (1893, 1896, 1898, 1900–1902, 1905 and 1908) for Hawke as a county captain.

An Australian team toured the British Isles for the first time in three years, but lost the three-match Ashes Test series to England. It was the 15th Test series between the two sides and England won 1–0.

Honours
County Championship – Yorkshire
Wisden (Five All-Round Cricketers) – George Giffen, Alec Hearne, Stanley Jackson, Harry Trott, Ted Wainwright

County Championship

Final table 

Points system:

 1 for a win
 0 for a draw
 -1 for a loss

Best batting average in the County Championship

Most wickets in the County Championship

Ashes tour 

England won a fifth successive home series against Australia to recover The Ashes after losing them in the 1891–92 series in Australia. W. G. Grace was injured for one of the Tests, but captained England in the other two. The first Test ended in a draw, but England took advantage of a 392-run lead on first innings to beat the visitors by an innings and 43 runs in the second Test, while the third and final Test was another draw.

Overall first-class statistics

Leading batsmen

Leading bowlers

References

Annual reviews
 James Lillywhite's Cricketers' Annual (Red Lilly), Lillywhite, 1894
 Wisden Cricketers' Almanack 1894

External links
 Cricket in England in 1893

1893 in English cricket
1893